Pleasant Nights is a 1966 Italian comedy film directed by Armando Crispino and Luciano Lucignani and starring Vittorio Gassman and Gina Lollobrigida.

Plot
Three comedic tales set in the Middle Ages.

Cast
 Vittorio Gassman - Bastiano da Sangallo
 Gina Lollobrigida - Domicilla
 Ugo Tognazzi - Uguccione
 Adolfo Celi - Bernadozzo
 Eros Pagni - Soldier
 Gigi Proietti - Mario di Colli
 Carmen Scarpitta
 Maria Grazia Buccella - Lucrezia Borgia
 Hélène Chanel
 Luigi Vannucchi
 Magda Konopka - Fiametta
 Omero Antonutti - Il Capitano
 Paolo Bonacelli

References

External links

1966 films
1966 comedy films
1960s Italian-language films
Films directed by Armando Crispino
Commedia all'italiana
Italian anthology films
1960s Italian films